Mohammed Gadafi Fuseini (born 16 May 2002) is a Ghanaian footballer who plays for SK Sturm Graz.

Club career 
Fuseini, he moved from the Ghanaian club Right to Dream Academy to Austria to join SK Sturm Graz in February 2022, where he joined the reserves side.  In his first season he made 14 appearances in the Regionalliga Mitte for  Sturm II at end of the 2021–22 season. At the end of the season SK Strum Graz II were crowned champions in the second division.

Ahead of the 2022–23 season, he was promoted to the senior squad. In July 2022, however, he made his first match of the season in the second division when he was named in the starting eleven against Horn on the first day of that season. Even though Strum II lost by 2–1, Fuseini scored Grazer's goal.

He made his first team debut in the UEFA Champions League in a 2–1 home loss to Dynamo Kyiv, coming on in the 102 minute of extra time for Jon Gorenc Stanković.

On 13 August 2022, he scored his second goal of the season, in Sturm Graz II 5–2 victory over SKN St. Pölten in the Austrian 2. Liga.

Career statistics

Club

References

External links 

 

Living people
2002 births
Ghanaian footballers
Association football wingers
Right to Dream Academy players
SK Sturm Graz players
Austrian Football Bundesliga players
Expatriate footballers in Austria
Ghanaian expatriate sportspeople in Austria
Ghanaian expatriate footballers
21st-century Ghanaian people